Okan Kocuk (born 27 July 1995) is a Turkish professional footballer who plays as a goalkeeper for the Turkish club Galatasaray in the Süper Lig.

Professional career
Kocuk made his professional debut for Bursaspor in a 2-1 Süper Lig win over Mersin İdmanyurdu on 1 March 2015. In 2016 Kocuk was loaned to Bandırmaspor, and in 2017 was loaned to İstanbulspor.

Galatasaray
On 18 July 2019, Kocuk joined Galatasaray on a four-year contract on a free signing.

Giresunspor (loan)
On 9 July 2021, Galatasaray announced that goalkeeper Kocuk was loaned to Giresunspor, the new team of the Süper Lig, until the end of the season.

International career
Kocuk is a youth international for Turkey at all youth levels In November 2017, Kocuk was called up to the senior Turkey national football team but did not make an appearance.

Honours
Galatasaray
Süper Kupa: 2019

References

External links
 
 
 
 Istanbulspor Profile

1995 births
Living people
People from Kemalpaşa
Turkish footballers
Turkey youth international footballers
Bursaspor footballers
İstanbulspor footballers
Galatasaray S.K. footballers
Giresunspor footballers
Süper Lig players
TFF First League players
Association football goalkeepers